Bror Benediktus Bernhard Brenner (July 17, 1855 – April 17, 1923) was a Finnish sailor who competed in the 1912 Summer Olympics. He was a crew member of the Finnish boat Nina, which won the silver medal in the 10 metre class.

References

External links
www.databaseolympics.com profile
 www.sports-reference.com

1855 births
1923 deaths
Finnish male sailors (sport)
Sailors at the 1912 Summer Olympics – 10 Metre
Olympic sailors of Finland
Olympic silver medalists for Finland
Olympic medalists in sailing
Medalists at the 1912 Summer Olympics